OK KAKANJ (Odbojkaški Klub Kakanj), is a professional volleyball club based in Kakanj, Bosnia and Herzegovina. The club was founded in 1979. The team plays in the Premier League of Volleyball of Bosnia and Herzegovina and has represented Bosnia and Herzegovina at European level in the Volleyball Men's CEV Cup where they are generally eliminated at 1/16 Finals stage.  The team's home venue is the KSC "Kakanj" arena in Kakanj.

Honours
Bosnia & Herzegovina League Champions (12): 1999/2000, 2000/01, 2002/03, 2003/4, 2004/5, 2007/08, 2008/09, 2009/10, 2011, 2012, 2013, 2022.

Bosnian & Herzegovina Cup Winners (15): 1993/94, 1994/95, 1995/96, 1996/97, 2000/01, 2001/02, 2002/03, 2003/04, 2005/06, 2007/08, 2008/09, 2009/10, 2010/2011, 2011/12, 2012/13.

League and Cup Double Crown (9): 2001, 2003, 2004, 2008, 2009, 2010, 2011, 2012,2013,.

Season 2005-2006

PREMIER LEAGUE OF VOLLEYBALL OF BOSNIA AND HERZEGOVINA 2005/2006 - OK Kakanj finished in 4th place

Final rankings 2005/2006

Championship Play-off 2005/06

BOSNIA & HERZEGOVINA NATIONAL CUP 2005/06 - won by OK Kakanj

OK Kakanj win 2005/2006 Bosnia & Herzegovina National Cup:

Season 2004-2005

Team Squad 2004-2005

PREMIER LEAGUE OF VOLLEYBALL OF BOSNIA AND HERZEGOVINA 2004/2005 - OK Kakanj finished in 1st place and won the 2004/2005 Championship

Final rankings 2004/2005

Championship Play-off 2004/05

BOSNIA & HERZEGOVINA NATIONAL CUP 2004/05 - OK Kakanj lost in Final

Season 2003-2004

Team Squad 2003-2004

PREMIER LEAGUE OF VOLLEYBALL OF BOSNIA AND HERZEGOVINA 2003/2004 - OK Kakanj finished in 1st place and won the 2003/2004 Championship

Final rankings 2003/2004

Championship Play-off 2003/04

BOSNIA & HERZEGOVINA NATIONAL CUP 2003/04 - won by OK Kakanj

References

External links
Team Squad Season 2008/2009 
Team images Season 2008/2009 at Image Shack 
Sport in Kakanj
Volleyball clubs established in 1979
Kakanj